Coasta may refer to several villages in Romania:

 Coasta, a village in Șieu-Odorhei Commune, Bistriţa-Năsăud County
 Coasta, a village in Bonţida Commune, Cluj County
 Coasta, a village in Golești, Vâlcea
 Coasta, a village in Păușești-Măglași Commune, Vâlcea County
 Coasta (band), an alternative rock band from Long Island, New York

See also 
 Coasta River (disambiguation)
 Costești (disambiguation)
 Costișa, name of several villages in Romania
 Costinești, name of two villages in Romania